From Companionship to Competition is an album by New York City hardcore punk band Kill Your Idols. It was released in January 2005 on SideOneDummy Records.

Critical reception
SF Weekly called the album the band's "finest, most satisfying, best-produced (but not slick-sounding) album to date."

Track listing
 "Intro/Blown Up, Burnt Out"–1:31
 "Stuck in a Rut"–1:48
 "I Hate My Guts"–2:28
 "20 Bucks" – 0:14
 "Only Dicks Don't Like Black Flag"–1:39
 "From Companionship to Competition"–2:18
 "Your Wish Is My Command"–2:24
 "We've Tried Nothing and We're All Out of Ideas"–1:02
 "Miserable and Satisfied"–1:52
 "Don't Call Me, I Won't Call You"–2:12
 "Make Up Your Minds"–2:16
 "15 Minutes"–1:57
 "I'll Call You Back"–2:22
 "Still Pist"–1:23
 "Looking Back"–3:13

Credits
 Andy West – vocals
 Gary Bennett II – guitar, backing vocals
 Brian Meehan – guitar, backing vocals
 Mike DeLorenzo – bass
 Vinnie Value – drums
 Produced by Noah Evans and Kill Your Idols
 Engineered by Noah Evans and Dean Baltulonis

References

2005 albums
Kill Your Idols albums